Salmo opimus is a salmonid fish in the genus Salmo. It was described by Davut Turan, Maurice Kottelat and Semih Engin in 2012, and is known from Turkey. The type locality was the Alara Stream in Gündoğmuş, Antalya Province. The species epithet, "opimus" (meaning "opulent" in Latin) refers to the large body size of the adults.

References

opimus
Taxa named by Davut Turan
Taxa named by Maurice Kottelat
Taxa named by Semih Engin
Fish described in 2012